The Giraglia Rolex Cup is a Mediterranean keelboat regatta, named after the island of Giraglia, which has been held annually since 1953.  It is jointly organized by the Yacht Club Italiano and the Yacht Club de France, with the help of the Société Nautique de Saint-Tropez.  Since 1997, in which year the current name was adopted, the race has been supported by the Rolex luxury wristwatch company.

The distance has been a constant in the race although the starting and ending points have been adjusted over time. Originally the course was from San Remo, Italy, past Giraglia to Toulon, France.

Race results

 2001 Idea beat My Song with 110 entrants
 2003 Alfa Romeo I (a Supermaxi) Neville Crichton (NZ) won with 170 entrants
 2006 Alfa Romeo II (a Supermaxi) Neville Crichton (NZ) won in 27 h 48 min 12 s
 2007 Alfa Romeo II, Neville Crichton (NZ), won again, in 22 h 45 min

References

External links
 2001 Giraglia Rolex Cup
 11th Giraglia Rolex Cup Rolex (2005) (PDF)

Recurring sporting events established in 1953
Sailing competitions
Yachting races
Sailing competitions in France
Sailing competitions in Italy
Rolex sponsorships